Marinko Matosevic (born 8 August 1985) is a retired Australian professional tennis player. His career-high singles ranking is World No. 39, which he achieved in February 2013. Matosevic defeated top players including Milos Raonic, Marin Čilić, Nikolay Davydenko, Jo-Wilfried Tsonga and John Isner.

Fans referred to Matosevic affectionately through his nickname "mad dog".

Personal life
Matosevic was born in Jajce, Bosnia and Herzegovina. He is of Croat descent. During his childhood, Matosevic's parents, Branko and Ljubica, moved the family to Melbourne, Australia and he now competes for his adopted country. While growing up he played soccer along with tennis and is a fan of cricketer Shane Warne as well as following the Sydney Swans in the Australian Football League.

Tennis career and background
Starting tennis at age 10, he trained at the Universal Tennis Academy from age 13.  Marinko was unable to obtain an ITF junior ranking. After achieving an ATP ranking inside the top 300 with Jay Salter, at the age of 24 Jay Salter
hired Marc Kimmich as Marinko Matosevic coach of Pure Tennis Academy as his coach. Working with Kimmich as his coach Marinko was able to increase from 300 to the top 150 over the next 3 years. Marinko was last coached by former ATP Professional and doubles specialist Mark Woodforde.

Matosevic won five futures titles and four ATP Challenger titles. His biggest title was in July 2010 at the $75,000 Comerica Bank Challenger in Aptos, California where, in a heated match with American Donald Young, he won the title in straight sets.

2010
In January 2010, he played his first Grand Slam match in Melbourne at the Australian Open and lost in the first round.

He entered the 2010 BNP Paribas Open, in Indian Wells as a qualifier. He beat Michaël Llodra in the first round before losing out to No. 9 seed Tsonga.

Matosevic won his first challenger tournament at the 2010 Comerica Bank Challenger beating the Donald Young in the final. A second challenger title followed in Calabasas when he beat Ryan Sweeting.

2011
In February, Matosevic was seeded number 1 for the 2011 Caloundra International, on the ATP Challenger Tour. In the first round, he defeated Chinese qualifier Wu Di. In the second round, he faced fellow Australian Brydan Klein and won. In the quarterfinals, Matosevic lost to Danai Udomchoke from Thailand.
He then went to America, where he entered the qualifying draw for the 2011 Delray Beach International Tennis Championship. He qualified, defeating Raven Klaasen, Bobby Reynolds and Igor Kunitsyn. He then took the place of number one seed Andy Roddick after he withdrew. In the first round, he lost to Dudi Sela of Israel.

2012: Breakthrough, first ATP final
After an unsuccessful start to the 2012 season (which included four consecutive losses in home tournaments) Matosevic entered the 2012 Caloundra International as the No. 2 seed and steamrolled his way to the title where he defeated Greg Jones in the final.

Matosevic continued his form when he entered the 2012 Delray Beach International Tennis Championships and qualified for the main draw. In the first round he ousted Ivo Karlović, he followed up the victory with a second round win over Alex Bogomolov, Jr. In the quarterfinals Matosevic defeated Ernests Gulbis to reach the semifinal. In the semifinal Matosevic played Israeli Dudi Sela where he defeated him to reach his first ever ATP final, where ultimately he lost to South African Kevin Anderson in straight sets.

Matosevic lost to Luxembourg's Gilles Müller in the opening round of Atlanta Open on 16 July.

In the first round of the US Open, Matosevic led Croatian 12th seed Marin Čilić by two sets to love before losing in five sets. In November Matosevic was voted the most improved player on the ATP Tour. In addition, Matosevic ended the year at World No. 49 and Australia's No. 1 player in singles.

2013: Reaching the Top 40

Matosevic began 2013 poorly with first round losses at the Brisbane International to Kei Nishikori and the Apia International to Bernard Tomic, both matches losing in straight sets. Like the 2012 US Open, Matosevic was defeated by Marin Čilić in the first round of the 2013 Australian Open. Nonetheless, Matosevic rebounded, and reached the semi-finals of Memphis by defeating Go Soeda, and upsetting 4th seed Sam Querrey and 7th seed Alexandr Dolgopolov before he retired against Kei Nishikori. As a result, he entered the top 40 reaching a career-high of World No. 39 on 25 February 2013. Soeda got his revenge however, by ousting Matosevic in the first round of Delray Beach.

At the Monte Carlo Masters, Matosevic earned one of the biggest victories of his career, defeating former top ten player Fernando Verdasco in the first round. He lost to eight-time champion Rafael Nadal in the next round. Matosevic upset Milos Raonic in the round of 16 at the Citi Open. In the quarterfinals of the same event he fell in a third set tiebreak to Dmitry Tursunov.

2014
Matosevic's season began at the Brisbane International where he defeated Julien Benneteau and Sam Querrey. He was defeated by Roger Federer in the quarter-finals in straight sets. During the second set, he was treated briefly for his shoulder injury which has persisted since the end of last season. He reach the quarterfinals of the 2014 Apia International Sydney defeating Florian Mayer and Andreas Seppi on the route but lost to Sergiy Stakhovsky. At the Australian Open, Matosevic was defeated by Kei Nishikori in five sets. At the French Open, he reached the second round of a Grand Slam tournament for the first time in his thirteenth attempt, defeating Dustin Brown in four sets. It was his first ever win at a Major tournament, and his first ever win in a best-of-5 sets match. The following week, Matosevic made the final of the 2014 Aegon Trophy, but lost to Marcos Baghdatis.  Matosevic won his second grand slam match by defeating the Spaniard Fernando Verdasco in four sets in the first round of Wimbledon.
Matosevic made it to the quarterfinals of the BB&T Atlanta Open where he fell to John Isner. In the first round of the Western & Southern Open Matosevic beat Nicolas Mahut in two sets. On match point the chair umpire overruled a Matosevic ace, after Matosevic won the match on his second serve he verbally berated the chair umpire and spit on the court.

2015
After gaining a wild card into Brisbane ATP tournament Matosevic lost first round to American Steve Johnson. Following his first round exit from the Brisbane ATP tournament Marinko was invited to fill in for Matthew Ebden at the Hopman Cup in Perth.

At the Australian Open, Matosevic recorded his first victory at the event after five previous unsuccessful attempts, defeating Alexander Kudryavtsev in five sets in the opening round. He then faced former Wimbledon champion Andy Murray in the second round but lost in straight sets. Matosevic then played in Memphis but lost in the first round. His next tournament was at Delray Beach where he caused an upset over World number 20 and second seed John Isner in the first round. He then lost in the second round to Yoshihito Nishioka. After Delray Beach, he played in Acapulco where he defeated Marcel Granollers before losing to eventual champion David Ferrer. Following this was a string of first round losses at Indian Wells, Irving, Miami, Houston, Barcelona, Estoril, Geneva, French Open and Rosmalen. This continued at Wimbledon as Matosevic let a two-set lead slip before losing to Liam Broady. Matosevic ended the year with a ranking of No. 296.

2016
Matosevic reached the second round of qualifying for the 2016 Australian Open before heading to North America where he qualified for and reached the quarter final of Dallas and Puebla challengers. In April, Matosevic headed to Asia and qualified for and reached the quarter finals of Santaizi and Busan challengers before heading to the United Kingdom with limited success. In August and September, Matosevic has his best singles results reaching the semi-finals of Bangkok and Nanchang challengers before ending the season in October. Matosevic ended 2016 with a ranking of No. 221.

2017
Matosevic lost in the first round of qualifying for the 2017 Australian Open before playing on the Asian challenger circuit between February and May; failing to pass round 1 in any. From July to August Matosevic played in North America also unable to pass round 1. In September,  Matosevic won his first challenger match for the year at Gwangju, ultimately reaching the quarter final. In October, Matosevic reached the semi-final of OEC Kaohsiung as a lucky loser, before playing further Asian challenger events until November. Matosevic ended 2017 with a ranking of No. 377.

2018
Matosevic commenced the year qualifying for and reaching the quarter final of the Playford Challenger. He lost in the first round of 2018 Australian Open men's singles qualifying. He has since played at the Burnie International, again being knocked out in the 1st round of qualifying. The Launceston International saw him progress to the round of 16, before being knocked out by Alexander Sarkissian. After a knockout in the round of 32 at the Morelos Open, Matosevic played the Oracle Challenger Series, being knocked out in the second round of qualifiers.

Matosevic retired from professional tennis in February 2018.

ATP career finals

Singles: 1 (1 runner-up)

Doubles: 1 (1 runner-up)

ATP Challenger and ITF Futures Finals

Singles: 16 (9–7)

Doubles: 5 (1–4)

Performance timelines

Singles

Doubles

References

External links

Marinko Pure Tennis Academy Profile
School Marinko Trained At

1985 births
Living people
Australian male tennis players
Australian people of Bosnia and Herzegovina descent
Australian people of Croatian descent
Bosnia and Herzegovina emigrants to Australia
Bosnia and Herzegovina refugees
Naturalised citizens of Australia
Naturalised tennis players
People from Jajce
Tennis players from Melbourne
Yugoslav Wars refugees
Hopman Cup competitors
Croats of Bosnia and Herzegovina